Andro may refer to:

Andro (name)
Andro (album), a 2020 album by Tommy Lee
Andro, Imphal East, a town in Manipur, India
A slang word for anabolic steroids
Androstenedione, a steroid, often called andro or andros for short
An Dro, folk dance from Brittany
A dialect of the Chakpa language

See also
Androcentrism
Andros (disambiguation)